United Nations Security Council resolution 484, adopted unanimously on 19 December 1980, after recalling resolutions 468 (1980) and 469 (1980) on the topic, the council expressed its concern regarding the expulsion of the Mayors of Hebron and Halhoul, as well as the Sharia judge of Hebron by occupying Israeli forces.

The resolution called upon Israel to adhere to the Geneva Conventions and to facilitate the return of the individuals concerned to resume the functions they were elected or appointed to do. The council also requested the Secretary-General to continually monitor the implementation of the resolution.

See also
 Israeli–Palestinian conflict
 List of United Nations Security Council Resolutions 401 to 500 (1976–1982)

References
Text of the Resolution at undocs.org

External links
 

 0484
 0484
Israeli–Palestinian conflict and the United Nations
1980 in Israel
December 1980 events